Autumn in New York is a 2000 American romantic drama film directed by Joan Chen and starring Richard Gere, Winona Ryder, and Anthony LaPaglia. Written by Allison Burnett, the film follows a successful middle-aged restaurateur and womanizer who falls in love with a sweet young woman who is terminally ill. United States distributor MGM took over the film from Chen and significantly re-edited the film, which also involved deleting a Winona Ryder nude scene. The film received generally negative reviews, but was a moderate commercial success, grossing $100 million on a $65 million budget.

Plot

Will Keane (Richard Gere) is a successful, late-middle-aged (he insists he is 48; Charlotte says he is 49; actor Gere was actually 50 during filming) restaurateur, womanizer and recently featured in a New York magazine cover story. Charlotte Fielding (Winona Ryder), a free-spirited young lady, celebrates her 22nd birthday in his upscale restaurant, and he immediately notices her. Her grandmother, who knows him well, introduces them. Will admires the hats that she made for her group of celebratory friends, and learns that Charlotte is the daughter of Katy, one of his former girlfriends, who died in an automobile accident shortly after Charlotte's birth.

The next day, Will calls and asks Charlotte to make a hat for his date for an upcoming benefit dinner. When she delivers the hat to his apartment a few days later, he invites her to accompany him to the formal benefit under the guise that he had been stood up. There they get to know each other and later end up back at his apartment where they have sex. The next morning, while having breakfast on his terrace, Will explains that their relationship has no future. She acknowledges this, revealing she is dying from a heart condition.

The next day, they walk through the fall foliage in Central Park, and Charlotte recites lines from the poem "God's World". As they talk, she takes his watch from him, saying she'll return it when he forgets she has it. At his restaurant, they prepare a meal together for his staff, and he begins to fall in love. She has an episode of severe chest pain; Will rushes her to the hospital. The doctor explains that her neuroblastoma, a rare illness in adults, has produced a tumor near her heart and she has perhaps a year to live. Asking him why his deep interest in food, Will responds, "Food is the only beautiful thing that truly nourishes."

At a Halloween party, Charlotte, dressed as Emily Dickinson, entertains children by reciting "Two Butterflies" Meanwhile, Will meets an ex (Jill Hennessy) and they end up on the roof having sex. Later, Charlotte confronts him and breaks off their relationship, which deeply affects them both.

Meanwhile, Will receives a letter from Lisa Tyler (Vera Farmiga), an illegitimate daughter that he has never met. He goes to her workplace (a museum), recognizes her from an old photo, but can't approach her. A few nights later he arrives home, finds her in the lobby and they talk for the first time. Married and pregnant, she has become sentimental about parenthood, wanting to meet her own father. She's had a dream that he's been trying to find her all these years to apologize for abandoning her. Will says quietly, "Yes I am (sorry)."

The next night, Charlotte returns home to find Will asleep in a chair. Angry at first, she tells him to leave, but he pleads for another chance. She cries as he holds her in his arms. In the morning, Charlotte recites to him from "Midnight" Later, while skating at Rockefeller Center, she suddenly collapses. At the hospital, they are told the tumor has grown and she's given only a few weeks left.

In the next days, Will searches for a specialist to perform the complicated surgery to save her. Asking his daughter for help, she finds a specialist who agrees to perform the surgery when the time comes. On Christmas morning, Charlotte wakes up and hears Will decorating. As she prepares to bring him his Christmas gift, she collapses. Rushed to the hospital, the surgeon is called. and Will, at her side, whispers to her lines from "To a young poet" before she is taken to the operating room.

Will, friends, Lisa, and Charlotte's grandmother wait during the long hours of surgery. Finally, the specialist emerges, and as he approaches it is clear that he could not save her. Back at his apartment, Will finds Charlotte's gift to him on the floor – a small box with the hat stem she designed for him. Opening it, he finds his watch she took on their first date. He stands at his window weeping, holding the box closely to his chest.

The following summer on a small boat on Central Park Lake, Will is holding his newborn grandson in his arms as his daughter Lisa looks on lovingly. Will notices a swan, and then a reflection in the water of a young woman walking over the bridge. The three drift peacefully on the lake.

Cast

 Richard Gere as Will Keane
 Winona Ryder as Charlotte Fielding
 Anthony LaPaglia as John Volpe
 Elaine Stritch as Dolores "Dolly" Talbot
 Vera Farmiga as Lisa Tyler
 Sherry Stringfield as Sarah Volpe
 Jill Hennessy as Lynn McCale
 J.K. Simmons as Dr. Tom Grandy
 Sam Trammell as Simon
 Mary Beth Hurt as Dr. Paul Sibley
 Kali Rocha as Shannon
 Steven Randazzo as Alberto
 George Spielvogel III as Netto
 Ranjit Chowdhry as Fakir
 Audrey Quock as Eriko
 Tawny Cypress as Melissa
 Daniella van Graas as Model at Bar
 Rachel Nichols as Model at Bar
 Liza Lapira as Charlotte's birthday friend

Production

Filming locations
 Manhattan, New York City, New York
 Central Park, Manhattan, New York City, New York
 Rockefeller Plaza, Manhattan, New York City, New York
 Wollman Skating Rink, 830 5th Avenue, New York City, New York
 Bow Bridge, The Ramble and Lake, Central Park, Central Park, Manhattan, New York City, New York
 88 Greenwich Street and Rector Street, Manhattan
 458 Washington Street, Manhattan, New York City, New York
 79th Street Boat Basin, Manhattan, New York City, New York
 66 Morton Street, Manhattan, New York City, New York
 Alexander Hamilton U.S. Custom House, Bowling Green, Manhattan (Native American Museum of New York)

Soundtrack

The original soundtrack music for Autumn in New York was composed and conducted by Gabriel Yared and featured vocal performances by Jennifer Paige, Madeleine Peyroux, Yvonne Washington, Sydney Forest, and Miriam Stockley. It was produced by Mitchell Leib and Peter Afterman.

Release

Home media
The film was released on VHS and DVD on January 2, 2001. The film debuted on Blu-ray on August 28, 2018 from MVD Entertainment Group.

Reception

Box office
The film opened in the #4 spot at the North American box office, earning $10,987,006 in its opening weekend, behind The Replacements, Space Cowboys, and Hollow Man. Autumn in New York earned $37,761,915 in domestic gross revenue, and $90,726,668 in gross revenue worldwide.

Critical response
Autumn in New York received generally negative reviews from film critics. Rotten Tomatoes gives the film 19%, based on 72 critic reviews, with an average rating of 4.11/10. The site's general consensus reads, "Although the film isn't as bad as feared (it wasn't pre-screened for reviews), it's not that good, either. Most noticeable flaws are the sappy romantic cliches and lack of chemistry between Gere and Ryder." On Metacritic, the film scored a 24 out of 100 rating, based on 21 reviews, indicating "generally unfavorable reviews".

Emanuel Levy of Variety gave the film a negative review, writing: "Autumn in New York is not a bad picture, just utterly banal. Desperately eager to register as a love affair in the mold of Hollywood's classics, Joan Chen's tediously sappy romantic meller is a kind of modern-day Love Story, with a "new" twist: The casting of Richard Gere as a suave lover old enough to be Winona Ryder's father. MGM release, which went into theaters without a press screening, should enjoy a decent opening due to an aggressive marketing campaign targeted at young susceptible femmes, but tearjerker should be out of sight long before the season in which its pedestrian story is set."

Owen Gleiberman of Entertainment Weekly wrote: "It's unfortunate that the film was directed by Joan Chen, who made the shattering Xiu Xiu: The Sent Down Girl. The gentle humanism of Chen's touch is much in evidence here, yet she can't undo the howler at the movie's center – namely, that Gere's serial dater has conveniently chosen to fall in love with the one young woman in Manhattan who won't be around in six months anyway.". Peter Rainer of NYmag wrote that Joan Chen had a 'lovely sense of film rhythm and a sophisticated eye for luxe effects, but she fell into a vat of goo and there's no climbing out of it'.

Awards
The film was nominated for a Razzie Award in 2001 for Worst Screen Couple (Richard Gere and Winona Ryder), but lost the award to Battlefield Earth.

Notes

References

External links
 
 
 

2000 films
2000 romantic drama films
American romantic drama films
2000s English-language films
Films about cancer
Films about death
Films directed by Joan Chen
Films produced by Tom Rosenberg
Films produced by Gary Lucchesi
Films scored by Gabriel Yared
Films set in New York City
Films shot in New York City
Lakeshore Entertainment films
Metro-Goldwyn-Mayer films
2000s American films